Trilogy is the seventh solo studio album by the United States-based blues guitarist and singer from Serbia, Ana Popović. It was released on May 20, 2016.

Development
Popović wrote or co-wrote the majority of the songs on the triple album, fifteen of the twenty-three songs.  She enlisted the help of many top industry guest artists, such as guitarist Joe Bonamassa, lap steel guitarist Robert Randolph, rapper Al Kapone, and drummers Bernard Purdie and North Mississippi Allstars's Cody Dickinson. She also got some impressive support behind the scenes, with Tom Hambridge and Delfeayo Marsalis among others producing songs for the album. When interviewed by Guitar World, Popović explained that she has always had a mix of styles on her albums, blues, jazz and funk. Some fans told her how they separated out the styles, making compositions of one style or the other, which intrigued Popović. Then in 2015 she had an incident on tour where the band's touring van was stolen with all the gear in it, and it was only with the support of her fans that they continued the tour. Popović was grateful, and wanted to give something back, so she conceived of the idea of doing a triple album divided into her various styles, so some could buy just the style they liked. She envisioned the project with different producers, different bands, and different recording studios.

The album is divided into three discs, with three different styles. Disc One – Morning is her soul, funk and R&B album, produced by Grammy-winning Warren Riker and Popović, and recorded at Esplanade Studios, New Orleans in Louisiana, Royal Studios and Music+Arts Studio, Memphis and The Switchyard, Nashville in Tennessee, and Full Sail Studio, Orlandoin Florida. Besides Popović's strong guitar work, Morning uses plenty of horns and piano, and features Joe Bonamassa as a guest guitarist on "Train", ending the song with a smoking outro.

Disc Two – Mid-Day contains the blues rock that is more typical of Popović. The songs were recorded and produced by several people at different locations. It was recorded by Warren Riker at Esplanade Studios, New Orleans in Louisiana, by Tom Hambridge at The Switchyard, Nashville in Tennessee, and by Cody Dickinson at the Zebra Ranch near Memphis in Mississippi. Popović includes a dueling guitar song "Woman to Love", where she dueled with herself via the magic of double-tracking. The disc contains a soulful duet with Alphonzo Bailey, better known as rapper Al Kapone.

Finally Disc Three – Midnight explores Popović jazz tendencies. This disc has more cover songs than any of the others, as she covers a Tom Waits song, a Duke Ellington number, and also a Billie Holiday tune. The jazz disc was recorded at Esplanade Studios, New Orleans in Louisiana by Delfeayo Marsalis, and uses a variety of saxophones, acoustic bass, and drums, with Kyle Roussell on piano. Popović tried out a new guitar for Midnight, using a Gibson ES-175 for the jazz numbers instead of her usual Strat which she uses for rock and blues. She also adapted her voice to jazz, leaving the growling and shouting for the first two discs and shifting to crooning, giving off a smokey late night vibe.

Track listing

 Total length: 1:33:55

Disc One – Morning

Disc Two – Mid-Day

Disc Three – Midnight

Personnel 

Disc One – Morning

Musicians
Ana Popović - vocals, guitar, slide guitar
Ivan Neville - keys, backing vocals
Derwin Perkins - rhythm guitar
George Porter Jr. - bass, backing vocals
Raymond Weber - drums, backing vocals
Harold Smith - rhythm guitar (tracks 2, 7 & 8)
Jackie Clark - bass (track 2, 7 & 8)
Jason Clark - keys (track 8)
Peewee Jackson - drums (track 8)
Mark Mullins - trumpet (tracks 1 & 2)
Bobby Campo - trombone (tracks 1 & 2)
Jason Mingledorff - saxophone
Joe Bonamassa - guitar (track 5)
Robert Randolph - lap steel guitar (track 8)
Angela Primm - backing vocals (track 6)
Anjelika Joseph and Erica Falls - backing vocals (tracks 5 & 7)

Production
Produced by Warren Riker and Ana Popović
Mixed by Warren Riker
Mastered by Dave Gardner

Disc Two – Mid-Day

Musicians
Ana Popović - vocals, guitar, slide guitar
Al Kapone - vocals (track 4)
Tommy Sims - rhythm guitar (tracks 1 & 2)
Cody Dickinson - keys, drums (tracks 4 & 6)
Ivan Neville - keys (track 7)
Derwin Perkins - rhythm guitar (track 7)
George Porter, Jr. - bass (track 7)
Raymond Weber - drums (track 7)
Jackie Clark - bass (track 3)
Jason Clark - keys (track 3)
Peewee Jackson - drums (track 3)
Michele Papadia - keys (track 2)
Mark van Meurs - bass (track 6)
Stéphane Avellaneda - drums (track 2)
Edward Cleveland - drums (track 1)
Angela Primm - backing vocals (track 3)

Production
Produced by Tom Hambridge (tracks 1, 2, 3 & 5)
Produced by Ana Popović and Cody Dickinson (tracks 4 & 6)
Produced by Warren Riker (track 7)
Mixed and Mastered by  Tom Hambridge and Michael Saint-Leon (except track 7)
Mixed and Mastered by  Warren Riker (track 7)

Disc Three – Midnight

Musicians
Ana Popović - vocals, guitar
Delfeayo Marsalis - trombone & horn arrangement
Khari Allen Lee - alto saxophone (tracks 1, 3 & 5)
Roderick "Rev" Paulin - tenor saxophone (tracks 1 & 3)
Scott Johnson - baritone saxophone (tracks 1 & 3)
Kyle Roussell - piano
David Pulphus - acoustic bass
Barry Stephenson - acoustic bass (tracks 6 & 7)
Herlin Riley - drums
Bernard Purdie - drums (track 6 & 7)

Production
Produced by Delfeayo Marsalis
Mixed and Mastered by Mischa Kachkachishvili

References

2016 albums
Ana Popović albums
Crossover jazz albums
Jazz albums by Serbian artists